This is a list of Global Boundary Stratotype Sections and Points. Since 1977, Global Boundary Stratotype Sections and Points (abbreviated GSSPs) are internationally agreed upon reference points on stratigraphic sections of rock which define the lower boundaries of stages on the geologic time scale. They are selected by the International Commission on Stratigraphy based on multiple factors, but their accessibility and the degree to which they are representative of the same boundary on sections worldwide are among the most important.

Since GSSPs require well-preserved sections of rock without interruptions in sedimentation, and since most are defined by different stages of animal life, defining them becomes progressively more difficult as one goes further back in time.

Organization of this list 
This list is divided first into the geologic eras of the Phanerozoic (the Cenozoic, the Mesozoic, and the Paleozoic) and then into the geologic periods of each era. Each period is marked below the era bar on top of its subdivided epochs and stages. Each stage is assigned an age in mya, an acronym for million years ago, which is the age at which it began. Most of these ages are derived from astronomical cycles in sediments, magnetic data, biostratigraphic data, and radiometric dating methods. The GSSP assigned to each stage is that stage's lower boundary and oldest point.

Ages are given in "million year ago" (mya). They are obtained with different radiometric dating methods depending on the type of rock and its age. Ages that have a tilde (~) prefix are approximate ages for GSSPs that have not been defined or not been accurately dated.

The Status column has a "golden spike" for every GSSP which has been formally agreed by the ICS. Those without have only candidate sections which have not yet been formally ratified. The clock stands for times that are currently defined only by an age.

The "Defining markers" column lists the evidence in the rock used to define the boundary. (Ideally, these are applicable in rock sections worldwide.) Most of the boundaries rely on the fossil record (biologic), paleomagnetic data (magnetic), and/or climate data determined by carbon and oxygen isotopes.

List

Cenozoic

Quaternary

Neogene

Paleogene

Mesozoic

Cretaceous

Jurassic

Triassic

Paleozoic

Permian

Carboniferous

Devonian

Silurian

Ordovician

Cambrian

Precambrian

Proterozoic

Archean and Hadean

See also 
Global Boundary Stratotype Section and Point (GSSP)
International Commission on Stratigraphy (ICS)
Geologic Time Scale
History of the Earth
Geological history of Earth

References

External links
International Commission on Stratigraphy (ICS)

Geology-related lists
Geologic time scales of Earth
Stratigraphy